Beldon Burn is a headwater stream of the River Derwent in Northumberland and County Durham, England.

It rises at Quickcleugh Moss as the  Quickcleugh Burn in the Pennines and flows for 6 miles, becoming the Beldon Burn, which runs along the boundary between the two counties. Approximately a mile west of Blanchland, it joins Nookton Burn to form the River Derwent.

See also
List of rivers of England

References

Rivers of Northumberland
Rivers of County Durham